Miranda Green may refer to:

 Miranda Green (journalist), British journalist and former Press Secretary
 Miranda Green (academic) (born 1947), British archaeologist and academic